Sydney Walter Martin "Marten" Cumberland (23 July 1892 – 1972) was a British journalist, novelist and editor. He also wrote under the pseudonym Kevin O'Hara. He specialised in the detective/mystery genre and created the character of Inspector Saturnin Dax, a French policeman.

During World War I, Cumberland served as a radio operator in the Merchant Navy. After the war, he worked successively for several newspapers and publishing houses as a writer. He also composed some detective stories for various magazines. He became a freelance journalist in 1924.

In 1923, Cumberland published his first novel, Loaded Dice, which he co-wrote with B.V. Shann. He married Kathleen Walsh in 1928. In his last years, he moved to Dublin, where he died in 1972.

Bibliography
 Loaded Dice (with BV Shann) (1926)
 The Perilous Way (1926)
 Mate in Three Moves (1929)
 The Diary of Death (1932)
 The Sin of David (1932)
 The Dark House (1935)
 Devil's Snare (1935)
 The Impostor (1935)
 Murder at Midnight (with BV Shann) (1935)
 Shadowed (1936)
 Bird of Prey (1937)
 Someone Must Die (1940)
 Questionable Shape (1941)
 Quislings Over Paris (1942)
 The Knife Will Fall (1943)
 The Testing of Tony (1943)
 Everything He Touched (1945)
 Not Expected to Live (1945)
 Steps in the Dark (1945)
 A Lovely Corpse (1946)
 Darkness As a Bride (1947)
 Hearsed in Death (aka A Dilemma for Dax) (1947)
 And Worms Have Eaten Them (aka Hate Will Find a Way) (1948)
 And Then Came Fear (1949)
 The Crime School (1949)
 On the Danger List (1950)
 Policeman's Nightmare (1950)
 Confetti Red Can Be (aka The House in the Forest) (1951)
 The Man Who Covered Mirrors (1951)
 Booked for Death (aka Grave Consequences) (1952)
 Fade Out the Stars (1952)
 One Foot in the Grave (1952)
 The Charge Is Murder (1953)
 Etched in Violence (1953)
 Which of Us Is Safe? (aka Nobody Is Safe) (1953)
 The Frightened Brides (1954)
 Utterly Until Death (1954)
 Lying at Death's Door (1956)
 Far Better Dead! (1957)
 Hate for Sale (1957)
 Out of This World (1958)
 Murmurs in the Rue Morgue (1959)
 Remains to Be Seen (1960)
 There Must Be Victims (1961)
 Watch Out! Saturnin Dax (1962)
 Postscript to a Death (1963)
 Hate Finds a Way (1964)
 The Dice Were Loaded (1965)
 It's Your Funeral (1966)
 No Feeling in Murder (1966)

As Kevin O'Hara
 The Customer's Always Wrong (1951)
 Exit and Curtain (1952)
 Sing, Clubman, Sing! (1952)
 Always Tell the Truth (1953)
 It Leaves Them Cold (1954)
 Keep Your Fingers Crossed (1955)
 The Pace That Kills (1955)
 Women Like to Know (1957)
 Danger: Women at Work! (1958)
 Well, I'll Be Hanged! (1958)
 And Here Is the Noose! (1959)
 Taking Life Easy (1961)
 If Anything Should Happen (1962)
 Do not Tell the Police (1963)
 Do not Neglect the Body (1964)
 It's Your Funeral (1966)

References

External links
Embden11.home.xs4all.nl
Amazon.com

1892 births
1972 deaths
British editors
British male journalists
British Merchant Service personnel of World War I
Writers from London
Date of death missing
Disease-related deaths in the Republic of Ireland
20th-century British novelists
British male novelists
20th-century English male writers